Agis III was the eldest son of Archidamus III, and the 21st Eurypontid king of Sparta.

Life
Agis was the son of King Archidamus III and the grandson of Agesilaus II, who belonged to the Eurypontid dynasty, one of the two royal families of Sparta (the other being the Agiads).

Following its defeat at Leuctra against Thebes in 371, Sparta lost its great power status within the Greek world, as well as a number of territories. In 351, Archidamus and Agis waged a war in the Peloponnese to recover these territories, notably against Megalopolis, a city established by the Thebans on its northwestern border in order to pose a permanent threat to Sparta. Despite the support of 3000 mercenaries from Phocis, the campaign was fruitless.

Agis III succeeded his father on 2 August 338 BC, on the day of the Battle of Chaeronea. 

After his victory against the Greeks at Chaeronea, Philip II founded the League of Corinth, a coalition of Macedonia and all the Greek city-states. Sparta refused to join, which prompted Philip to campaign in Laconia in autumn 338. He then gave several Spartan territories to the city's neighbours—Denthaliates to Messene, Aygitis and Belminatis to Megalopolis, Skiritis to Tegea, and Thyreatis to Argos—in order to keep Sparta in check.

In 333 BC, Agis went with a single trireme to the Persian commanders in the Aegean Sea, Pharnabazus III and Autophradates, to request money and armaments for carrying on hostile operations against Alexander the Great in Greece. The satraps agreed to support Agis; however, they could only spare for him 30 talents and 10 ships. The news of the Battle of Issus in 333 BC, however, put a check upon their plans.  He sent his brother Agesilaus with instructions to sail with them to Crete, that he might secure that island for the Spartan interest.  In this he seems in a great measure to have succeeded.

War against Macedon
Two years after this Spartan success (331 BC), the Greek states which were in league against Alexander seized the opportunity that had risen from the military disaster of the Macedonian general Zopyrion's campaign against the Scythians, combined with the Thracian revolt, to declare war against Macedonia. Agis was invested with the command and with his Spartan troops, and a body of 8,000 Greek mercenaries who had been present at the Battle of Issus, gained a decisive victory in the Peloponnese over a Macedonian army under Coragus.

Having been joined by the other forces of the league (Elis, Achaea and Arcadia), Agis laid siege to Megalopolis. The city held out until Antipater came to its relief. In the subsequent Battle of Megalopolis, Agis' army fought a larger Macedonian force, but was finally defeated, Agis himself died trying to gain his surviving men time to withdraw to safety.

On the manner of his death, Diodorus comments:
He had fought gloriously and fell with many frontal wounds. As he was being carried by his soldiers back to Sparta, he found himself surrounded by the enemy. Despairing of his own life, he ordered the rest to make their escape with all speed and to save themselves for the service of their country, but he himself armed and rising to his knees defended himself, killed some of the enemy and was himself slain by a javelin cast. He had reigned nine years.

Agis was succeeded by his brother Eudamidas I.

References

Bibliography
 Paul Cartledge & Antony Spawforth, Hellenistic and Roman Sparta, A tale of two cities, London and New York, Routledge, 2002 (originally published in 1989). 
Françoise Ruzé & Jacqueline Christien, Sparte, Histoire, mythe, géographie, Malakoff, Armand Colin, 2017. 
Graham Shipley, "The Extent of Spartan Territory in the Late Classical and Hellenistic Periods", The Annual of the British School at Athens, Vol. 95 (2000), pp. 367–390.

Year of birth unknown
4th-century BC rulers
4th-century BC Spartans
Eurypontid kings of Sparta
Ancient Greek generals
Ancient Greeks killed in battle
Deaths by javelin
331 BC deaths
Monarchs killed in action